Dichomeris purpureofusca is a moth in the family Gelechiidae. It was described by Walsingham in 1882. It is found in North America, where it has been recorded from Nova Scotia to New Jersey, the Northwest Territories, Alberta and South Dakota.

The forewings are deep purplish fuscous. The hindwings are brownish fuscous. Adults are on wing from June to August.

References

Moths described in 1882
purpureofusca